OSN Movies is a series of premium movie channels provided by OSN for the Middle East and North African market. The channels include content such as the latest Hollywood films of various genres from major companies such as Disney, 20th Century Studios, Warner Bros., Sony Pictures Entertainment, Universal Pictures, Metro-Goldwyn-Mayer, and DreamWorks Animation.

List of OSN Movie channels
OSN Movies Hollywood HD 
OSN Movies Action 
OSN Movies Premiere HD
OSN Movies Premiere +2 HD
OSN Kids 
OSN Family HD

External links

See also
OSN
OSN Sports
OSN News

Television stations in Dubai
Pay television